"Whoopty" is the debut single by American rapper CJ. The song was initially self-released on July 30, 2020, before being re-released by Warner Records following his signing to the label. The song reached number 10 on the US Billboard Hot 100 chart in February 2021, as well as number three in the UK and the Billboard Global 200 top 10. It was produced by the Cypriot producer Pxcoyo and samples Arijit Singh's "Sanam Re" (2015). The song was officially remixed by fellow American rappers French Montana and Rowdy Rebel, titled "Whoopty NYC", and by Puerto Rican rappers Anuel AA and Ozuna, titled "Whoopty Latin Mix".

Background
The song is a remix of King Von and Memo600 "Exposing Me" Song, it contains a sample of the Indian song "Sanam Re" (2015) by Arijit Singh and Mithoon. It is reminiscent of Brooklyn drill and marks a departure from CJ's melodic rapping. CJ said he received comparisons to late American rapper Pop Smoke, because of the song's drill sound. He said in an interview with HipHopDX that Pop Smoke's absence inspired "Whoopty", who he considers the artist that popularized the music style. He attributed its popularity to the energy conveyed in the track and its video.

Critical reception
Pitchforks Alphonse Pierre wrote that while the song "may be the biggest drill record of the last several months", "everything about it is so painfully unoriginal" in that it combines "Pop Smoke's uk drill production with 22Gz's lingo". In an earlier piece for the same site, Pierre felt the lyrics "might as well have been spit out by a machine trained on the Raps and Hustles YouTube page" and concluded that "[T]he only good thing to ever come out of Staten Island remains the Wu-Tang Clan". Tom Breihan of Stereogum had similar critiques for the song, though he added, "The song works. It moves."

Charts

Weekly charts

Year-end charts

Certifications

Release history

References

2020 debut singles
2020 songs
CJ (rapper) songs
Songs written by CJ (rapper)
Songs written by Mithoon
Warner Records singles